Krewella is an American electronic dance music band from the Chicago suburb of Northbrook, Illinois, United States, that formed in 2007. Their musical style has been mainly described as EDM, dance-rock, and dance-pop. However, Krewella's style has been influenced by a number of electronic sub genres, including progressive house, electro, dubstep, drum and bass, trap music and future bass.

Their debut EP, Play Hard, was released on June 18, 2012, exclusively on Beatport, followed by its release on other digital platforms on June 26, 2012. Later, their debut album, Get Wet, was released on September 24, 2013, on iTunes.

The band consists of sisters Jahan and Yasmine Yousaf. Originally a trio, their third member and producer Kristopher Trindl left the band in 2014. The band's name stems from Jahan's misspelling of the word "cruel" when the two began writing music, and is not a reference to Cruella de Vil.

History

2007–2013: Formation and career beginnings 
Krewella formed in 2007 and consisted of sisters Jahan and Yasmine Yousaf, whose father is of Pakistani descent, along with producer Kris Trindl. The three met as students at Glenbrook North High School. Their music is a blend of self-produced electro house and dubstep, with influences of many other EDM styles. All three members of the band have "6-8-10" tattoos to commemorate June 8, 2010, the day when the three agreed to give up their careers, schooling, and any other intentions for their lives, to dedicate all of their time to the band's joint music career. In December 2011, they were signed to Canadian independent electronic music label Monstercat; "Killin' It" was Krewella's first original song released by a label. Monstercat promoted Krewella with social media campaigns and partnered with EDM YouTube promotional channels for a larger platform. In June 2012, Krewella released their EP Play Hard. The second single, "Alive" peaked at number one on the US Dance/Mix Show Airplay chart and also placed on the US Billboard Hot 100.

Krewella has headlined at EDM festivals around the globe including Ultra Music Festival, Electric Daisy Carnival, Stereosonic, Spring Awakening, Sunburn Festival and Paradiso festival. These live performances earned them the 2012 International Dance Music Award for "Best Breakthrough Artist."

After their performance at Ultra Music Festival 2013, Billboard declared that "Krewella is going to be huge!" Their debut album Get Wet charted in the Top 10 of the US Billboard 200 in its first week. Krewella teamed up with producer group Cash Cash to make their second single "Live For The Night".

2014–2015: Lawsuit, Trindl's departure and Somewhere to Run  
In January 2014, Krewella partnered with EDM lifestyle brand Electric Family to produce a collaboration bracelet for which 100% of the proceeds are donated to Dance For Paralysis. The partnership has raised over $17,000 as of April 2014.

In September 2014, it was announced that Trindl is no longer part of Krewella. Trindl subsequently filed a lawsuit against the sisters for $5 million, claiming that he was unfairly "thrown out" of the band. The Yousaf sisters countersued, claiming Trindl had drug and alcohol problems, "pretended to DJ" onstage, and ultimately resigned from the band.

On November 24, 2014, Krewella released their first single following Trindl's departure titled "Say Goodbye". The track reflects on the loss of a member and the lawsuit against the Yousaf sisters.

On March 23, 2015, Krewella released "Somewhere to Run" produced by Pegboard Nerds and others.

In June 2015, Krewella's "Somewhere to Run" was featured in the Las Vegas Convention and Visitors Authority's "Krewellavator" marketing campaign. The spot was filmed in an actual elevator at the MGM Grand Las Vegas.

Krewella released Troll mix Vol. 14 - Return of the Trolls on August 15, 2015, its title a reference to the time gap following the previous one. This mix is the first released after Trindl's departure. The hour long mix features a new track from the sisters, named "Surrender the Throne". It also includes a new remix of their single "Somewhere to Run".

The sisters were featured on the single "Love Song to the Earth" alongside; Paul McCartney, Jon Bon Jovi, Sheryl Crow, Fergie, Colbie Caillat, Natasha Bedingfield, Leona Lewis, Sean Paul, Johnny Rzeznik, Angélique Kidjo, Kelsea Ballerini, Nicole Scherzinger, Christina Grimmie, Victoria Justice and Q'orianka Kilcher.

In August 2015, it was announced that Jahan and Yasmine Yousaf had settled the lawsuit with Kris Trindl out-of-court. The terms of the settlement were not made public.

2016: Ammunition 
Krewella announced in 2015, that they had been working on a new extended play, intended to be completed in time for a 2016 tour. From that time out prior to the release there were many snippets of upcoming music including the songs "Broken Record", "Helter Skelter", "Beggars" (with Diskord), "Louder Than Bombs", "Friends", "Superstar" (with Pegboard Nerds and NGHTMRE) and "Marchin On".

The single "Beggars" (With Diskord) was released on April 29, 2016. Krewella have stated that "Broken Record" will be released a week before Ammunition.

Krewella were set to present at the inaugural Electronic Music Awards which were supposed to be held on April 23, 2016, but were postponed to later in the year.

On April 29, 2016, Krewella released a 30-second video of Yasmine rapping to the tune of Kanye West's song "I Love Kanye" stating "F**k it, tomorrow we gon' give you all some new Krewella" prior to the release of the single "Beggars" with Diskord. The music video for the song was released at the same time.

On May 4, 2016, a video titled "Love, Yazzy" was released to the public of Yasmine speaking of her memories of Krewella since her beginnings with the band. The end of the video stated the release date of Ammunition which was May 20, 2016. Two days after this, a video titled "Love, Jahan" which talked about unity and a "krew without borders" before announcing a new, smaller more intimate SWEATBOX Tour. This headlining Fall tour spanned across 16 dates in North America and Canada and featured brand new music and their entire live band.

On May 10, 2016, the promotional single "Broken Record" was released.

On the last few days before the release, teasers for "Surrender the Throne", "Marching On", "Beggars", "Broken Record", "Ammunition", and "Can't Forget You" were released, with the latter being released one day before Ammunition's release.

On May 27, 2016, Krewella was featured on a single by Pegboard Nerds and NGHTMRE titled "Superstar" that did not make the final cut for the Ammunition EP.

2017–2018: New World, Coke Studio and further singles
In an interview with Gary Vee, the sisters stated that they were currently in the studio working on a follow up to Ammunition. They have since played more teasers, such as "Angels Cry", "dead af", "Team", and "Rise Up". "Team" was later released.
Krewella hinted at two new songs on their Snapchat while performing in Sydney for New Year's Eve. One of them is called "Be There". More teasers have been played since then, in fact there are almost 11 unreleased songs altogether. "Be There" was due to be released by the end of March, finally releasing on May 10, 2017. They also confirmed their own record label, named Mixed Kids Records, with "Be There" becoming their first release on it.

In 2017, Krewella partnered with dance-fitness program Zumba. They made a song called "I Got This" for their new STRONG program, which entails of workouts to high energy music. This has yet to be released, but it was teased on the STRONG Instagram page. On May 17, they played at a Zumba 'fitness concert' where they played a set while instructors and attendees performed a dance workout. Here, they teased a song called "Thrilla", which following the release of another single on May 31, 2017, a song called "Love Outta Me". They released the first part of their two part EP New World on June 8, 2017. They later announced their New World Tour with a video from Aladdin with Yasmine's face over Jasmine and Jahan's face appearing on random characters throughout.

Krewella estimated that New World Part 2 would be released by mid-2017, then later by early September 2017 and before their New World Tour, but neither of these release dates eventuated. Multiple teasers of possible songs exist, such as "dead af", "Rise Up", "New World" (with Yellow Claw), "Angels Cry", "I Got This", "Thrilla", "Alibi", "Like We", and multiple unnamed songs. They released a new single, "New World", on September 18, 2017, featuring Yellow Claw and Taylor Bennett. "Dead AF" was later released as a single on October 24, 2017.

On October 31, Krewella went on livestream from their tour bus on EDM social app 'WAV'. They mentioned that New World Part 2 should be released in 2018. They also teased five unreleased songs: "Run Away", "Bad Liar", "Alarm" (with Lookas), "Ain't That Why" (with R3HAB), "Another Round" (with Pegboard Nerds) and "Angels Cry". "Another Round" with Pegboard Nerds was released on November 17, "Alarm" with Lookas was released on December 1, and "Ain't That Why" with R3HAB was released on December 8. "Angels Cry" followed on December 29, 2017, released through their fan phone line—anyone who texted the line previously received a text with a link, and anyone else can text "angel tears" to the number to receive it.

Krewella mentioned a version of "New World" (with Yellow Claw) featuring Chinese rapper VAVA. While Krewella were in China, they posted on social media with VAVA, appeared at one of her concerts in Beijing, and also filmed a music video for this version. It was released in January 2018.

In February 2018, Krewella released "Alibi" alongside a music video, which featured footage from their New World Tour. In April, they released "Runaway". An animated music video was released in May created by 3D Multimedia production studio Blunt Action. The next single, "Gold Wings" with Shaun Frank was released in May 2018. In June 2018, they released a cover of Bazzi's track "Mine" with BKAYE, as part of a compilation album by Cure8 records titled "disCOVERED vol. 1". Krewella also released "Bad Liar" later that month.

As of July 2018, they are featured in Coke Studio (Pakistan) Season 11 as featured artists and were also part of the well-received Season promo song "Hum Dekhenge" which was rendition of Poem written by Faiz Ahmad Faiz. Their featured Coke Studio debut song "Runaway" (a rendition of their previous single) was an instant hit in Pakistan. The song also was a reconnect with their Pakistani roots. Paired with the raw power of Riaz Qadri and Ghulam Ali Qadri's folk vocals, the bank brought their first fusion track about hijr (separation from a beloved). Primarily an English song, Jahan and Yasmine also sing in one of their native languages for the first time. The vocal harmonies combined with a driving dholak groove and soulful sarangi is what makes "Runaway" a tasteful juxtaposition.

In August 2018, they released "Soldier" in collaboration with American bass producer Jauz as part of his album "The Wise and the Wicked".

New World Pt. 2 was never released.

2019–2020: zer0 
In mid-2019, Krewella started teasing a 'new era' on their social media pages. The first single from their next album, "Mana" was released on August 22, 2019. A music video created by French artist Gabyo was released on the same day, featuring an extended version of the song. The extended version was released on streaming platforms in September 2019, alongside a remix by American producer Slippy.

The second single, "Ghost" was released in October 2019, alongside a music video.

In December 2019, Krewella released "Good On You" in collaboration with Indian producer Nucleya. On the same day, they announced their second studio album "zer0", due to be released on January 31. A music video for "Good On You" was released two weeks later, which was filmed during Krewella's visit to India for Sunburn Festival.

The final single from the album, "Greenlights" was released on January 18, 2020. A music video was released on the same day, filmed in Indonesia and included footage from their set at Djakarta Warehouse Project. This gave Krewella's second number one on Billboard's Dance/Mix Show Airplay chart in April 2020. As of 2022, the song has amassed over 13 million streams on Spotify.

The album "zer0" was released on January 31, 2020. The album featured the tracks "zer0",  "Mana" (Extended Mix), "Good On You" (with Nucleya), "Anxiety" (featuring Arrested Youth), "Paradise" (featuring Asim Azhar), "Like We" (featuring Yung Baby Tate and Alaya), "Scissors", "Ghost", "Martyr", "Overboard" and "Greenlights".

A tour for the zer0 album was announced, featuring 13 shows across North America, set to begin in April 2020. The tour was cancelled due to the Covid-19 Pandemic.

Two remix EPs of "zer0" were released in March and April 2020 respectively, featuring remixes from MOTi, REAPER, Lit Lords, MADGRRL, Slippy, Prince Fox, Toneshifterz, BEAUZ, SHIVARASA and Futuristic Polar Bears.

In May 2020, Krewella released "Goddess" in collaboration with Australian sister duo NERVO, featuring Indo-American rapper Raja Kumari. The song featured heavy themes of women's empowerment, as Krewella and NERVO are two of the most prominent female acts in electronic music. To fit this theme, three remixes of the song were released, by Brooke Evers, Holly T and Sippy, all of whom are also women in electronic music.

In July 2020, Krewella released "Rewind" with Yellow Claw, alongside an animated music video.

Due to the cancellation of the "zer0" Tour, Krewella worked with Insomniac Events to create the "zer0 Live Concert Experience"; a virtual event held on November 27, 2020. This featured a hybrid DJ/Live Vocal set from Krewella, as well as DJ sets from support acts SHIVARASA and REAPER, both of whom were featured on the zer0 remix EPs. The event was broadcast on Insomniac's Twitch (service) page, and has since been uploaded to both Insomniac and Krewella's YouTube channels. During this, they premiered a new song, "Lay It Down", which was released as a bonus track on the limited "zer0" vinyl.

2021–present: The Body Never Lies 
In July 2021, Krewella released "Lay It Down" in collaboration with Illenium and SLANDER, as part of Illenium's album "Fallen Embers". This track was based on the previous, solo version of "Lay It Down" that was released exclusively on the "zer0" vinyl.

In November 2021, Krewella began teasing new music on their social media pages. Soon after, they announced their next single, "Never Been Hurt" in collaboration with BEAUZ. The track was released alongside a music video on November 19.

On December 17, 2021, they released "No Control" with MADGRRL. A music video was released on December 25.

In January 2022, Krewella announced their third studio album "The Body Never Lies", to be released on March 4. The album features 10 tracks, including "Never Been Hurt" and "No Control". They also announced a North American tour, featuring 20 shows, set to begin on April 1.

Soon after, they announced the next single off the album, titled "I'm Just A Monster Underneath, My Darling". The track was released on January 28 alongside a lyric video created by photographer and graphic designer Olivia Van Rye. It is Krewella's first drum & bass song since "Surrender The Throne" was released in 2016.

'The Body Never Lies' was released on March 4 including 10 tracks: "ashes to ashes, dust to dust (intro)", "Traces", "No Control" (w/ MADGRRL), "In The Water", "War Forever", "You Don't Even Have To Try", "Never Been Hurt" (w/ BEAUZ), "Drive Away", "6 Feet", and "I'm Just A Monster Underneath My Darling". A music video for "Drive Away" premiered on Facebook that day and was released on YouTube two days later.

Members 

 Jahan Yousaf – DJ, vocals, producer, writer (2007–present)
 Yasmine Yousaf – DJ, vocals, writer, producer, FX music controllers (2007–present)
 Kris Trindl – DJ, producer, FX music controllers (2007–2014)

Session/touring members
Frank Zummo – drums, percussion (2015–2017)
Max Bernstein – lead guitar, rhythm guitar, keyboards (2015–2017)

Timeline

Discography 

 Get Wet (2013)
 zer0 (2020)
 The Body Never Lies (2022)

References

External links 

Living people
Club DJs
Dubstep musicians
Remixers
American electronic dance music groups
Dance-rock musical groups
Musical groups established in 2007
Musical groups from Chicago
Columbia Records artists
Ableton Live users
People from Northbrook, Illinois
Electronic music duos
Sibling musical duos
Family musical groups
American musical duos
Monstercat artists
American women in electronic music
American women record producers
American musicians of Pakistani descent
Year of birth missing (living people)
21st-century American women